Toma Sokolov (November 6, 1938 – December 21, 2011) was a Bulgarian sprint canoer who competed in the early 1960s. He finished sixth in the C-2 1000 m event at the 1960 Summer Olympics in Rome.

References
Toma Sokolov's profile at Sports Reference.com
Toma Sokolov's obituary 

1938 births
2011 deaths
Bulgarian male canoeists
Canoeists at the 1960 Summer Olympics
Olympic canoeists of Bulgaria